Stories of the Revolution is a 1960 Cuban drama film directed by Tomás Gutiérrez Alea. It was entered into the 2nd Moscow International Film Festival.

Cast
 Bertina Acevedo
 Enrique Fong
 Miriam Gómez
 Francisco Lago
 Lilian Llerena
 Calixto Marrero
 Reynaldo Miravalles
 Blas Mora
 Eduardo Moure
 Tomás Rodríguez
 Encarnita Rojas
 Pascual Zamora

See also 
 List of Cuban films

References

External links
 

1960 films
1960 drama films
1960s Spanish-language films
Cuban black-and-white films
Films directed by Tomás Gutiérrez Alea
Cuban drama films